Jerry Lee Keeps Rockin' is the 34th studio album by Jerry Lee Lewis, released on Mercury Records in 1978.

Background
Jerry Lee Keeps Rockin''' was Lewis's final album with Mercury Records, the label he had been with since 1963. Although Lewis was no longer scoring hits with the frequency that he had been earlier in the decade, the Waylon Jennings-flavored "I'll Find It Where I Can" hit the top 10 on the country chart. The album, however, only reached number 40 on the Billboard country albums chart. In the liner notes to the 1995 Mercury compilation Killer Country, Colin Escott observes that by this time producer Jerry Kennedy "had become tired of hassling with Jerry Lee Lewis, and the rewards were getting smaller. Jerry Lee's motivation for entering the studio was sapped by the fact that whatever he made in royalties and advances was being garnished by the IRS. When he didn't sound bored, he often arrived with a voice  fried to a crisp from a long tour or two or three nights of roaring."  "I thought it was healthy that he left," Kennedy explains in the 2006 box set A Half Century of Hits''. "He was tired." Lewis confided to biographer Rick Bragg in 2014 that leaving was a "bad mistake. I should have never left Jerry Kennedy. I should have never left Mercury Records. 'Cause they were too good to me."

Track listing
"I'll Find It Where I Can" (Michael Clark, Zack Van Arsdale)
"Don't Let the Stars Get in Your Eyes" (Slim Willet)
"Sweet Little Sixteen" (Chuck Berry)
"Last Cheaters Waltz" (Sonny Throckmorton)
"Wild and Wooly Ways" (Bob Morrison, Alan Rush)
"Blue Suede Shoes" (Carl Perkins)
"I Hate You" (Leroy Daniels, Dan Penn)
"Arkansas Seesaw" (Michael Bacon, Thomas Cain)
"Lucille" (Albert Collins, Richard Penniman)
"Pee Wee's Place" (Duke Faglier)
"Before the Night Is Over" (Ben Peters)

Personnel
Jerry Lee Lewis - lead vocals
Janie Fricke, Ginger Holladay, Millie Kirkham, The Jordanaires, Bergen White, Trish Williams - backing vocals
Mike Leech - bass guitar
Jerry Carrigan, Buddy Harman - drums
Kenny Lovelace - fiddle
Jimmy Capps, Johnny Christopher, Ray Edenton, Duke Faglier, Jerry Kennedy, Grady Martin, Jerry Shook, Pete Wade, Chip Young - guitar
Hargus "Pig" Robbins - piano
Harold Bradley - 6-string bass guitar
Pete Drake, Weldon Myrick - steel guitar
George Binkley III, Marvin Chantry, Carl Gorodetzky, Lennie Haight, Sheldon Kurland, Christian Teal, Samuel Terranova, Stephanie Wool - strings
Bergen White - string arranger
Bob Moore - upright bass

1978 albums
Jerry Lee Lewis albums
Albums produced by Jerry Kennedy
Mercury Records albums